SourceForge is a brand name that may refer to:
 SourceForge (SF.net), a source code repository and centralized location for software developers to control and manage open source software development
 SourceForge Enterprise Edition (SFEE), the former name of TeamForge, a proprietary collaborative application lifecycle management software forge
 SourceForge, Inc., the former name of Geeknet, which owned SF.net and formerly developed SourceForge Enterprise Edition
 SourceForge.JP, the former name of OSDN, a Japanese site similar to SF.net, and spun off to a separate company in 2007